Gilla Mo Choinni Ua Cathail (died 1147) was King of Uí Fiachrach Aidhne.

Gilla Mo Choinni was the only member of the Ó Cathail sept to rule Aidhne. He was a descendant of Cathal mac Ógán. They were rulers of Cenél Áeda na hEchtge until expelled by their Ó Seachnasaigh cousins in the 13th century. Thereafter they settled in north County Galway and fell into obscurity.

References
 Irish Kings and High-Kings, Francis John Byrne (2001), Dublin: Four Courts Press, 
 CELT: Corpus of Electronic Texts at University College Cork

People from County Galway
1147 deaths
12th-century Irish monarchs
Year of birth unknown
Gaels